Gates of Delirium is the fourth studio album by Midnight Syndicate, released March 3, 2001, by Entity Productions. The album is set in the fictitious haunted Haverghast Asylum and features the blend of horror-inspired symphonic music and sound design the band had become known for.

Background and release 
Gates of Delirium was written, produced, and mixed by Edward Douglas and Gavin Goszka. In a 2001 interview, Gavin Goszka said that musically, the album encompassed their most intense and involving material to date and, production-wise, was by far their most intricate. Edward Douglas said that he felt they were "truly able to realize their cinema of the mind" concept on Gate of Delirium with the mix of sound effects and music. The album artwork and photography was designed by Mark Rakocy, the same artist who handled the design and artwork for the Midnight Syndicate debut.

The album was released through Entity Productions and self-distributed nationally through chains like Spencer Gifts, Hot Topic, Border Books, Best Buy, as well as in amusement parks, costume shops, and Halloween-merchandise retailers. To mark the release of the album, the group decorated the Tyr nightclub in Lakewood, Ohio to look like a mental institution and had a cast of actors who pretended to be its mad patients.

Reception and post-release 
During the 2001 Halloween weekend, six of the band's mp3 singles, including two from Gates of Delirium, were in the Top 20 for all of MP3.com. Daniel Hind of Outburn Magazine called the album impressive with a more developed concept although less eerie than previous releases. Rue Morgue Magazine gave it a 5 out of 5, calling it "choice audio theater" and Haunted Attraction Magazine called it a "masterpiece," praising the versatility of its potential uses in the haunted attraction industry. Jeff Niesel of Cleveland Scene Magazine praised the album's effectiveness and production values adding though that it still suffered from the fact that was "best suited as background music."

Gates of Delirium was among the first Midnight Syndicate albums to receive a review from a table top game/role-playing game publication when, in 2001, Games Unplugged Magazine praised Gates and the band's previous two releases as having the "right balance of power and transparency," adding that they could "serve just about any horror adventure very well." In 2007, Midnight Syndicate teamed up with Goodman Games to produce Cage of Delirium, a Dungeon Crawl Classics role-playing game adventure based on Gates of Delirium which came packaged with the CD. Cage of Delirium was nominated for Best Adventure in the 2007 ENnie Awards.

Track listing

Personnel 
Edward Douglas – composer
Gavin Goszka – composer
Christopher Robichaud - voice actor
Trishalana Kopaitich - voice actor
Dana Armstrong - voice actor
Ted Neroda - voice actor

Production 
Producers – Edward Douglas, Gavin Goszka
Mixing - Edward Douglas, Gavin Goszka
Mastering – Gavin Goszka
Artwork, Photography, Design - Mark Rakocy
Financial Consultant - Edward P. Douglas

Release History 
Entity Productions MS1004-CD (March 6, 2001): First CD issue
Entity Productions MS1004-CD (2006): CD reissue with alternate cover art by Rob Alexander

References

2001 albums
Midnight Syndicate albums